Kristina Miletić (born 21 April 2000) is a Croatian swimmer. She competed in the women's 400 metre freestyle event at the 2018 FINA World Swimming Championships (25 m), in Hangzhou, China. She also competed in the women's 800 metre freestyle event.

References

2000 births
Living people
Croatian female swimmers
Croatian female freestyle swimmers
Place of birth missing (living people)
Swimmers at the 2015 European Games
European Games competitors for Croatia
21st-century Croatian women